Encounter is the third studio album by Australian singer-songwriter Mark Holden. The album was released in September 1977 and peaked at number 40 on The Australian charts where it was certified gold for more the 50,000 copies.

Track listing

Charts

References

Mark Holden albums
1977 albums
EMI Records albums
Pop albums by Australian artists